Libre is the fifth studio album recorded by Mexican-American singer Jennifer Peña. It was released by Univision Records on June 11, 2002 (see 2002 in music), Libre debuted on Billboard Top Latin Albums Chart at #2 with a 17 track listing of which spawned several top ten hits including "Vamos al Mundial", which was selected by the U.S Hispanic network Univisión as the official song of the 2002 World Cup Soccer tournament.  Libre also includes the #1 Hot Latin Track "El Dolor de Tu Presencia" which spent eight weeks atop of the charts in the summer of 2002 along with "Entre el Delirio y la Locura". Recorded in Miami Beach, Florida and Glendale, California it was executive produced by José Behar and included production by Rudy Pérez, Kike Santander, Gustavo Santander, Enrique Elizondo, José Luis Arroyave and José Gaviria.  Libre was a crossover album for Peña, who has spent the first phase of her career recording Tejano music. Libre re-introduced Jennifer as a pop singer with romantic ballads, dance songs that were far more mainstream than anything she had recorded before. Libre became one of the most successful Latin albums of 2002 selling over 500,000 units certified multi-Platinum by the RIAA. The album was nominated for a Grammy Award.

Track listing

Singles

"Vamos Al Mundial" (2002) FIFA World Cup Song (PROMO) 
"El Dolor De Tu Presencia" (2002/2003) Hot Latin Tracks # 1 for 8 Weeks 
"Entre El Delirio y La Locura" (2002) Hot Latin Tracks # 6
"A Fuego Lento" (2003) Hot Latin Tracks # 21

Personnel 

Levi Mora Arriaga – keyboards
Meredith Mora Arriaga – guitar
José Luis Arroyave – arranger, engineer, keyboards, producer, programming
José Behar – executive producer
Nelson Cano – vocals
Vicky Echeverri – vocals
Enrique Elizondo – engineer, producer
Joaquin Pérez Fernández – engineer
Jonathon Fuzessy – vocal coordinator, vocals
Claudia García – vocals
Iker Gastaminza – mixing
José Gaviria – arranger, engineer, keyboards, producer, programming
Beppe Gemelli – keyboards, programming
Piero Gemelli – guitar
Gabby Giannelli – art coordinator
Bernie Grundman – mastering
Julio Hernández – bass
Paul Hoyle – arranger, keyboards, programming
Erick Labson – mastering
David López – assistant engineer
Manny López – guitar
Alfredo Matheus – mixing
Sergio Minski – production coordination
David Mora-arriaga – Bass
Joel Numa – engineer, mixing
José Luis Pagán – arranger, keyboards, programming
Mario Patiño – production coordination
Jennifer Peña – vocals
Betsy Pérez – production coordination
Rudy Pérez – arranger, director, guitar, producer, vocals
Clay Perry – keyboards, programming
Catalina Rodríguez – vocals
Barry Rosen – photography
Arturo Salas – arranger
Manuel Sánchez – mixing
Kike Santander – producer
Andrés Felipe Silva – executive director
Ramiro Terán – arranger, keyboards, programming, vocal coordinator, vocals
Fernando Tobón – bass, guitar (acoustic), guitar (electric)
Juan José Virviescas – engineer
Dan Warner – guitar
Bruce Weeden – engineer, mixing

Sales and certifications

References

2002 albums
Jennifer Peña albums
Spanish-language albums
Univision Records albums
Albums produced by Rudy Pérez
Albums produced by Kike Santander
Albums recorded at Q-Productions